The mayoral election of San José of 2002 were the first democratic elections of the modern era to choose the newly created figure of Mayor and two deputy mayors (following the reform to the Municipal Code made in 1998), of the municipality of San José, capital of Costa Rica as with other municipalities. Syndics and District Councilmen were also elected for each of the canton's districts.

The winner was then the Municipal Executive of San José (until then appointed by the City Council of San José) Johnny Araya Monge of the National Liberation Party with 36% of the votes. Other candidates were Fernando Zumbado of San José Alliance, Luis Marino Castillo of the Social Christian Unity Party and Benjamín Odio of the Citizen Action Party.

Results

References

San José, Costa Rica
2002 elections in Central America
Mayoral elections in Costa Rica
2002 in Costa Rica